Jorge Paulo Costa Almeida (born 14 October 1971) is a Portuguese retired footballer who played as a central defender, currently manager of Académico de Viseu.

Nicknamed Bicho (animal) and Tanque (tank) by his colleagues and fans for his aggressive and physical playing style, he spent most of his professional career with Porto, being team captain for several seasons and winning a total of 24 major titles, notably eight Primeira Liga championships and the 2004 Champions League.

Having earned 50 caps for Portugal, Costa represented the nation at one World Cup and one European Championship. After retiring, he worked as a manager for several clubs as well as the Gabon national team.

Playing career

Club
Born in Porto, Costa made his professional debut with F.C. Penafiel on loan from hometown club FC Porto. The following season he was also loaned, to fellow Primeira Liga side C.S. Marítimo, playing 31 games including a controversial one in the Estádio das Antas where he scored an own goal; despite it being clearly unintentional the accusations of scoring for his team continued, forcing Porto's president Jorge Nuno Pinto da Costa to forbid further loaned players to play against them, a decision that stood for several decades.

Costa finally joined Porto in the 1992–93 campaign, eventually becoming a starter. Five seasons later he switched to jersey No. 2, previously worn by João Pinto, also being named team captain as the veteran retired. His career three only met four black spots: two serious knee injuries (during 1995–96, which ruled him out of UEFA Euro 1996 and during 1997's pre-season in Sweden) and a feud with coach Octávio Machado early in 2001–02, which forced him into "exile" at Charlton Athletic. However, the image of Costa as the captain went untouched, and Porto fans turned against Machado with massive criticism of his team management and coaching, eventually forcing him outside the club; during his time in South London, he played in defence alongside Luke Young, Mark Fish and Jonathan Fortune, in a back-line remembered for its pun name of "Young Fish Costa Fortune".

Additionally, in 1996–97's UEFA Champions League, Costa was involved in an incident with A.C. Milan's George Weah on 20 November 1996, with the Liberian breaking his nose, alleging that he had been racially abused. Costa strenuously denied the accusations of racism and was not charged by UEFA as no witnesses could verify Weah's allegations, not even his Milan teammates. Weah, on the other hand, was suspended for six matches, and later attempted to apologise to Costa but this was rebuffed by the Portuguese, who considered the charges of racist insults levelled against him to be defamatory and took the Liberian to court; the incident resulted in the latter being sidelined for three weeks, also having to undergo facial surgery.

Costa returned to Porto in the summer of 2002 as José Mourinho was now in charge, and was unanimously chosen as captain of a side that went on to win a championship-cup–UEFA Cup treble, making him the third Porto skipper in a row to lift cups at international level (following Pinto and Fernando Gomes). The player's winning streak continued as the next season he lifted the Champions League and the Intercontinental Cup.

In January 2006, after having been deemed surplus to requirements by new coach Co Adriaanse, Costa signed for Standard Liège from Belgium, reuniting with former Porto teammate Sérgio Conceição, and helped his new team to a runner-up finish in the league. He decided to retire from the game in June after alleging personal reasons, despite having a running contract until 2007.

International
Costa made his full international debut for Carlos Queiroz' Portugal on 11 November 1992 in a 2–1 friendly win over Bulgaria in Saint-Ouen-sur-Seine, France. He played alongside Fernando Couto as the team reached the semi-finals of UEFA Euro 2000 in Belgium and the Netherlands.

Costa scored the first of two goals on 15 November 2000, in a 2–1 exhibition defeat of Israel at the Estádio 1º de Maio in Braga. He retired from international football after a group stage elimination at the 2002 FIFA World Cup in South Korea and Japan, having played 50 games; in that competition, he scored an own goal in a 2–3 loss to the United States.

Previously, in 1991, Costa was an undisputed starter as the Portuguese team won the FIFA U-20 World Cup.

Coaching career

2000s
In the 2006–07 season, Costa began his coaching career with S.C. Braga, first as assistant to Rogério Gonçalves, whom he replaced in February 2007. In his first season he led the Minho side to the fourth place and the semi-finals of the domestic cup, also reaching the round of 16 in the UEFA Cup, being ousted by Tottenham Hotspur 4–6 on aggregate.

After again guiding Braga to the UEFA Cup group stage, Costa was fired midway through his second year. He then moved to second level's S.C. Olhanense in the following campaign, eventually finishing the season as champions and returning the Algarve team to the first division after 34 years. After helping them to the 13th position the following campaign – thus safe from relegation – he left, joining another top-division club, Académica de Coimbra.

Costa announced his departure from Académica and his retirement from coaching on 21 December 2010, citing personal reasons. The team was placed in ninth position after the 14th round, eventually narrowly escaping relegation.

2010s
In May 2011, Costa reneged on his retirement and signed a contract with Romania's CFR Cluj. He was dismissed the following 8 April with the team five points clear in first place with nine games to go in Liga I, following a 5–0 home loss to nearest challengers CS Dinamo București.

On 24 October 2012, AEL Limassol FC appointed Costa as their new manager, on the eve of a Europa League group stage tie against Fenerbahçe SK. In the following summer he moved teams but stayed in Cyprus, penning a 1+1 deal with Anorthosis Famagusta FC.

Costa coached the Gabon national team from 2014 until November 2016, being ousted from the 2015 Africa Cup of Nations group stage after one win and two losses. He returned to club duties on 15 May 2017, being appointed at CS Sfaxien. He moved back to his homeland in the following off-season, signing at Segunda Liga side F.C. Arouca and leaving by mutual consent less than three months later due to a poor string of results.

On 22 November 2017, Costa was hired at Tours FC, last-placed in France's Ligue 2. At the end of the season, with the club relegated in the same position, he resigned with a year remaining on his contract.

In August 2018, Costa signed for Mumbai City FC for the upcoming campaign of the Indian Super League. After a third-place finish, the team lost 5–2 on aggregate to FC Goa in the play-off semi-finals, conceding all of those goals in the first leg at home. On 5 March 2020, after finishing one place off qualification for the post-season, he was allowed to leave.

2020s
On 23 September 2020, Gustavo Ndong Edu, president of the Equatoguinean Football Federation, announced that Costa would be the new coach of the national team. Six days later, however, he decided to join Romania's CS Gaz Metan Mediaș instead.

Costa returned to the Portuguese top tier on 4 February 2021, replacing the dismissed Sérgio Vieira at S.C. Farense on a four-month contract. In spite of relegation to the second division, he signed a new deal; on 30 August, however, he left by mutual consent after only one point in four matches to start the new campaign.

On 3 February 2022, Costa returned to Sfaxien for the remainder of the season. He was dismissed on 7 April after a six-game winless run, concluding with a 1–1 draw at home to ES Hammam-Sousse.

Costa went back to his country's second tier on 7 September 2022, being hired by Académico de Viseu F.C. in place of Pedro Ribeiro. On 20 December, he led the team to a 2–1 home win over top-flight club Boavista F.C. to make the semi-finals of the Taça da Liga for the first time. They were eliminated there by Porto, as in the quarter-finals of the national cup.

Career statistics

Club

International

|}

Managerial statistics

Honours

Player
Porto
Primeira Liga: 1992–93, 1994–95, 1995–96, 1996–97, 1997–98, 1998–99, 2002–03, 2003–04
Taça de Portugal: 1993–94, 1997–98, 1999–2000, 2000–01, 2002–03
Supertaça Cândido de Oliveira: 1993, 1994, 1996, 1998, 1999, 2001, 2003, 2004
UEFA Champions League: 2003–04
UEFA Cup: 2002–03
Intercontinental Cup: 2004

Portugal
FIFA U-20 World Cup: 1991

Individual
Portuguese Golden Ball: 2000

Manager
Olhanense
Segunda Liga: 2008–09

Cluj
Liga I: 2011–12

Individual
CNID Breakthrough Coach: 2008–09

References

External links

1971 births
Living people
Portuguese footballers
Footballers from Porto
Association football defenders
Primeira Liga players
FC Porto players
F.C. Penafiel players
C.S. Marítimo players
Premier League players
Charlton Athletic F.C. players
Belgian Pro League players
Standard Liège players
UEFA Cup winning players
UEFA Champions League winning players
Portugal youth international footballers
Portugal under-21 international footballers
Portugal international footballers
UEFA Euro 2000 players
2002 FIFA World Cup players
Portuguese expatriate footballers
Expatriate footballers in England
Expatriate footballers in Belgium
Portuguese expatriate sportspeople in England
Portuguese expatriate sportspeople in Belgium
Portuguese football managers
Primeira Liga managers
Liga Portugal 2 managers
S.C. Braga managers
S.C. Olhanense managers
Associação Académica de Coimbra – O.A.F. managers
F.C. Paços de Ferreira managers
S.C. Farense managers
Académico de Viseu F.C. managers
Liga I managers
CFR Cluj managers
CS Gaz Metan Mediaș managers
Cypriot First Division managers
AEL Limassol managers
Anorthosis Famagusta F.C. managers
Tunisian Ligue Professionnelle 1 managers
CS Sfaxien managers
Ligue 2 managers
Tours FC managers
Indian Super League head coaches
Mumbai City FC head coaches
Gabon national football team managers
2015 Africa Cup of Nations managers
Portuguese expatriate football managers
Expatriate football managers in Romania
Expatriate football managers in Cyprus
Expatriate football managers in Gabon
Expatriate football managers in Tunisia
Expatriate football managers in France
Expatriate football managers in India
Portuguese expatriate sportspeople in Romania
Portuguese expatriate sportspeople in Cyprus
Portuguese expatriate sportspeople in Gabon
Portuguese expatriate sportspeople in Tunisia
Portuguese expatriate sportspeople in France
Portuguese expatriate sportspeople in India